Fernando E. Cruz (born March 28, 1990) is a Puerto Rican professional baseball pitcher for the Cincinnati Reds of Major League Baseball (MLB). He made his MLB debut in 2022.

Career
The Kansas City Royals selected Cruz in the sixth round of the 2007 MLB draft as an infielder. He became a pitcher in 2011, but was released in 2012. He joined the Chicago Cubs organization in 2015, pitched in independent baseball leagues from 2016 to 2018, and in the Mexican League in 2018 and 2021. 

The Cincinnati Reds signed Cruz as a free agent in January 2022 and assigned him to the Louisville Bats. In 2022 in the minor leagues, he was 4–4 with a 2.89 ERA in 56 innings, and second in the minor leagues with 23 saves.

The Reds promoted Cruz to the major leagues on September 1, 2022, and he made his MLB debut the following day, aged 32. He played for the Puerto Rican national baseball team in the 2023 World Baseball Classic.

References

External links

Living people
1990 births
Arizona League Royals players
Cangrejeros de Santurce (baseball) players
Caribes de Anzoátegui players
Charros de Jalisco players
Cincinnati Reds players
Criollos de Caguas players
Idaho Falls Chukars players
Indios de Mayagüez players
Iowa Cubs players
Leones de Ponce players
Louisville Bats players
Major League Baseball pitchers
Major League Baseball players from Puerto Rico
Mariachis de Guadalajara players
Myrtle Beach Pelicans players
New Jersey Jackals players
People from Bayamón, Puerto Rico
Pericos de Puebla players
Tennessee Smokies players
Tigres del Licey players
2023 World Baseball Classic players
Puerto Rican people of Dominican Republic descent